Jonathan Eig (born April 26, 1964) is an American journalist and biographer and the author of five books. His most recent book, Ali: A Life, is a biography of Muhammad Ali.

Biography
Eig was born in Brooklyn, New York and grew up in Monsey, New York. He is Jewish. His father was an accountant and his mother was a stay-at-home mom and community activist. Eig began working for his hometown newspaper when he was 16. He attended Northwestern University's Medill School of Journalism, graduating in 1986 with a bachelor's degree. After college he worked as a news reporter for the New Orleans Times-Picayune, The Dallas Morning News, Chicago magazine, and The Wall Street Journal. Eig has taught writing at Columbia College Chicago and lectures at Northwestern. He has written as a freelancer for many outlets, including The New York Times, Washington Post, and online edition of The New Yorker. He is married to Jennifer Tescher and has three children. He lives in Chicago.

Eig appeared on The Daily Show with Jon Stewart in May 2010. He has appeared in two PBS documentaries—Prohibition and Jackie Robinson—made by Ken Burns and Florentine Films. He is currently working with Burns as a consulting producer on a documentary about Muhammad Ali.

In 2016, Eig appeared on AMC's The Making of the Mob: Chicago, talking about Al Capone.

Reception 
In 2019 Men's Health magazine named Eig's book Ali: A Life the 23rd best sports book of all time.
In 2020, Esquire magazine called Ali one of the 35 best sports books ever written. Esquire also called Eig's book Luckiest Man one of the 100 best baseball books]of all time.

Eig's first book was Luckiest Man: The Life and Death of Lou Gehrig (2005). Opening Day: The Story of Jackie Robinson's First Season was his second book. For his third book, Get Capone, Eig discovered thousands of pages of never-before-reported government documents on the government's case against Capone. The Birth of the Pill (2014), Eig's fourth book, told the story of the renegades who invented the first oral contraceptive.

In a 2017 review of Ali: A Life, Joyce Carol Oates, writing for The New York Times, said: "This richly researched, sympathetic yet unsparing portrait of a controversial figure for whom the personal and the political dramatically fused could not come at a more appropriate time in our beleaguered American history…. As Muhammad Ali's life was an epic of a life so Ali: A Life is an epic of a biography. Much in its pages will be familiar to those with some knowledge of boxing but even the familiar may be glimpsed from a new perspective in Eig's fluent prose; for pages in succession its narrative reads like a novel — a suspenseful novel with a cast of vivid characters who prevail through decades and who help to define the singular individual who was both a brilliantly innovative, incomparably charismatic heavyweight boxer and a public figure whose iconic significance shifted radically through the decades as in an unlikely fairy tale in which the most despised athlete in American history becomes, by the 21st century, the most beloved athlete in American history."

Published works
Luckiest Man: The Life and Death of Lou Gehrig (2005)
Opening Day: The Story of Jackie Robinson’s First Season (2007)
Get Capone: The Secret Plot that Captured America's Most Wanted Gangster (2010)
The Birth of the Pill: How Four Crusaders Reinvented Sex and Launched a Revolution (2014)
Ali: A Life (2017)

Awards
2005 Casey Award for best baseball book of the year, Luckiest Man
2014 Washington Post "Best Books of the Year" for The Birth of the Pill
2015 Society of Midland Authors, non-fiction book of the year, The Birth of the Pill
2017 NAACP Image Awards, finalist, Ali: A Life
2017 William Hill Sports Book of the Year, best sports book, finalist, Ali: A Life
2018 Plutarch Award, best biography, finalist, Ali: A Life
2018 PEN/ESPN Award for Literary Sports Writing, Literary Sports Writing, winner for Ali: A Life
2018 The Times Biography of the Year], Sports Book Awards, London, for Ali: A Life
2018 Sports Book of the Year, British Sports Book Awards, for Ali: A Life
2018 New York Times Notable Book, for Ali: A Life

References

External links
Jonathan Eig - official website
The St. Valentine's Day Massacre - Excerpt from Get Capone (Chicago Magazine, May 2010)

Jonathan Eig  on IMDb

1964 births
Living people
American male journalists
Jewish American journalists
People from Monsey, New York
American sportswriters
Medill School of Journalism alumni
21st-century American Jews
Sportswriters from New York (state)
20th-century American Jews
20th-century American journalists
20th-century American male writers
21st-century American journalists
21st-century American biographers
21st-century American male writers
American male biographers
Columbia College Chicago faculty
Northwestern University faculty